Coos may refer to:

People
Cowasuck, also known as Cowass or Coös, an Algonquian-speaking Native American tribe in northeastern North America
Coos people, an indigenous people of the Northwest Plateau in Oregon
Confederated Tribes of Coos, Lower Umpqua and Siuslaw Indians, federally recognized tribe of Coos people

Places

Inhabited places in the United States
Coös County, New Hampshire
Coos Bay, Oregon, a small city on Coos Bay
Coos County, Oregon

Landforms
 Coos Bay, an inlet of the Pacific Ocean
 Coos River, southwest Oregon

Other uses
 Coosan languages, the language of the Pacific Coos people

See also
Coosa (disambiguation)
Kos, an island southwest of Asia Minor